The original Carnegie South Omaha Public Library, designed by Thomas R. Kimball, was built in 1904 at 23rd and M Streets in South Omaha, Nebraska. A Carnegie library, it was razed in December 1953; a new library constructed in the same spot opened in October 1954. The second library building was officially closed on May 17, 2008, when a new branch was opened at 2808 Q Street.

History
The library was funded by a grant of $50,000 from the Andrew Carnegie Library Fund. The city's plan to erect a new library for the growing area of South Omaha began with the purchase of a lot at 23rd and M Streets in 1902 for $3,5000.   Thomas Rogers Kimball was hired to design the structure.   He chose a Renaissance Revival style, reminiscent of a small Italian palazzo.  The two-story building was built of brick and rusticated limestone.  The front entrance was decorated with an carved arch supported by columns.  Flanking both sides of the entrance were two arched windows, the larger with iron grating.  The first floor was devoted to circulation and basic library services, while the second floor contained a large assembly room. There was solid oak woodwork throughout and the building was topped with a red clay tile roof.

When the City of Omaha annexed South Omaha in 1915, the South Omaha Public Library became the first branch of the Omaha Public Library system.   The building remained active until December 1953 when it was razed; a new library was built on the same site.

The second South Omaha Public Library building opened in October 1954.  In contrast to the Carnegie library, the second library was a modern one-story building with floor-to-ceiling glass along one wall, designed by Leo A. Daly architects of Omaha. The second library building was officially closed on May 17, 2008, when a new branch was opened at 2808 Q Street.

See also
 Original Omaha Public Library Building
 Omaha Public Library System Overview
 Omaha Public Library Branches

References

External links 
 Historic Photo of South Omaha Public Library
 Alternate Photo of South Omaha Public Library
 Sketch of South Omaha Public Library
 South Omaha Public Library Postcard

History of Omaha, Nebraska
Demolished buildings and structures in Omaha, Nebraska
Buildings and structures demolished in 1953
Library buildings completed in 1904